Digvijay is a given name. Notable people with the name include:

Digvijay Bhonsale (born 1989), Indian Rock and Metal vocalist, guitarist and songwriter
Digvijay Narayan Chaubey, Indian politician and a member of 17th Legislative Assembly of Uttar Pradesh of India
Digvijay Deshmukh (born 1998), Indian cricketer
Digvijay Nath (1894–1969), the mahant of the Gorakhnath Math in Gorakhpur, India
Digvijay Narain Singh (1924–1991), Indian politician who served as a Member of Parliament
Digvijay Singh (Bihar politician) (1955–2010), Indian politician from the state of Bihar
Digvijay Singh (golfer) (born 1972), professional golfer from India
Digvijay Singh (politician) (born 1947), Indian politician and a Member of Parliament in the Rajya Sabha
Digvijay Singh (Rajasthan politician), Minister of Agriculture of Rajasthan
Kanwar Digvijay Singh (born 1961), Indian businessman turned politician and Member of Parliament (MP)
Kunwar Digvijay Singh (1922–1978), popularly known as "Babu", Indian field hockey player

See also
Param Digvijay Dal, registered political party of India
Digvijay Stadium, an international multi-sports stadium in Rajnandgaon, India
Digvijaya (disambiguation)
Vijay (disambiguation)